The China Graduate School of Theology (CGST) is a theological seminary in Kowloon Tong, Hong Kong. The President is Bernard Wong, who succeeded Stephen Lee in 2021.

CGST is accredited by the Asia Theological Association to offer Master of Christian Studies, Master of Divinity, and Master of Theology degrees. It is also a member of the Association for Theological Education in South East Asia.

History
CGST started on 28 September 1975. In the mid 1960s, a group of students at Westminster Theological Seminary developed the idea of establishing "an indigenous, inter-denominational, evangelical and graduate level theological institution for the purpose of training university graduates to serve the churches in China and to evangelize around the world." This group included Jonathan Chao (who became the first President) and Che Bin Tan. Tan had noticed that "in America, seminaries assume that the spiritual needs of students will be met through their church involvement". Thus, "a major aim of CGST, in reaction against the perceived neglect in America of the students' spiritual growth, has been to incorporate the spiritual dimension more effectively in the lives of the students." CGST has also been "working at specialized approaches to reach blue collar workers," including the composition of Christian hymns "using well known Chinese folk tunes".

According to its mission statement, CGST upholds the "absolute truth of the Bible's inerrancy", and "works toward a contextual theology that is relevant to and brings transformation to Chinese culture." It also values expository preaching and spiritual formation.

CGST has two campuses close together: Devon Campus on Devon Road, and Dorset Campus on Dorset Crescent.

The institution previously published a journal, the China Graduate School of Theology Journal (CGST Journal or CGSTJ). It was founded in 1986 with Wilson Chow as the editor-in chief. Publication ceased in 2013, due to a perceived need to "build up new and effective ways for conducting and publicizing theological dialogues."

Leadership
 Philip Teng (1975–1988) - Honorary President
 Wilson Chow (1989–2006) - President Emeritus 
 Carver Yu (2006–2013) - President Emeritus
 Stephen Lee (2013–2021) - President Emeritus
 Bernard Wong (2021–present)

Faculty

Biblical Studies
Ka Leung Wong - Chan Chu So Wah Professor
Simon CC Cheung - Henry Co See Cho Associate Professor 
Joyce WL Sun - Carver Yu Associate Professor
Xia Xia Xue - Wilson Chow Associate Professor
Kelvin Yu - Assistant Professor
Lilian Wing Ting Li - Assistant Professor
Grace Au - Assistant Professor
Johnson Yip - Assistant Professor
Chun Luen Wu - Assistant Professor

Theological Studies
Kin Yip Louie - Heavenly Blessings Professor
Daniel Lee - Eleanor and Wayne Chiu Professor
Jean Lee - Abundant Grace Professor
Jun Song - Philip Teng Associate Professor
Bernard Wong - S Y King Associate Professor
Celine Yeung - Assistant Professor

Practical Studies
Wance Kwan - Philip Yeung Associate Professor
Timothy Au - Josiah Mann Associate Professor
Yi Jung Pan - Lam Ko Kit Tak Associate Professor
Mo Yu So - Assistant Professor

Counselling Studies
Raymond Au - Carson & Virginia Mok Professor 
Edmond Lam - Associate Professor

Former Faculty
Ronald Y. K. Fung - prominent biblical commentator - now retired.
 Fred T. Cheung - now retired
Carver Yu - President Emeritus - now retired.
Phee Seng Kang - now retired.
Philip Yeung - Honorary Chaplain
Wai Yee Ng - now retired.
Wallace Louie - now retired.
Wing Hung Lam - now retired.
Sau Wah Leung
Jason Yeung
Xi Yi (Kevin) Yao
Esther Yue L. Ng
Kin Lam - former chaplain
Stephen Lee - President Emeritus and Visiting Professor
Luke Cheung
Kasper Wong
Liang Hong
Jane Mann
Tracy Lo
May Yip
Wing Yan Chan Mok - Visiting Professor

References

External links

Educational institutions established in 1975
Universities and colleges in Hong Kong
Evangelical seminaries and theological colleges
Seminaries and theological colleges in Hong Kong